Muregina is a genus of sea snails, marine gastropod mollusks in the family Muricidae, the murex snails or rock snails.

Species
Species within the genus Muregina include:

 Muregina lugubris (Broderip, 1833)

References

Ocenebrinae
Monotypic gastropod genera